is a railway station in Saiki, Ōita, Japan. It is operated by JR Kyushu and is on the Nippō Main Line.

Lines

Layout 
The station consists of two side platforms serving two track with a siding set on a side hill cutting in a remote mountainous area. The station is not staffed and there is no station building. A small shed and a public telephone call box are provided as a passenger shelter near the station entrance and another shelter is provided on the opposite side platform. The platforms are linked by a footbridge.

Adjacent stations

History
The Kyushu Railway was nationalised on 1 July 1907. Japanese Government Railways (JGR), designated the track as the Hōshū Main Line on 12 October 1909 and expanded it southwards in phases over the next 13 years, establishing Shigeoka as its southern terminus on 26 March 1922. The entire stretch of track was then renamed the Nippō Main Line. On the same day, 
Sōtarō was opened as a signal box on the linking track. On 1 March 1947, Sōtarō was upgraded to a full station. With the privatization of Japanese National Railways (JNR), the successor of JGR, on 1 April 1987, the station came under the control of JR Kyushu.

Passenger statistics
In fiscal 2015, there were a total of 144 boarding passengers, giving a daily average of less than 1 passenger.

See also
List of railway stations in Japan

References

External links 

Sōtarō (JR Kyushu)

Railway stations in Ōita Prefecture
Railway stations in Japan opened in 1947